Bradley M. Rockwood served in the Massachusetts Senate. He was from Franklin, Massachusetts.

See also
 131st Massachusetts General Court (1910)

References

People from Franklin, Massachusetts
Massachusetts state senators
1862 births
Year of death missing